Thomas Sylvester Taylor (4 December 1880 – 15 August 1945) was a Canadian amateur soccer player who competed in the 1904 Summer Olympics as a member of a Canadian team made-up of Galt F.C. players. In St. Louis he was the soccer tournament's joint top scorer with three goals as his side won the gold medal.

Biography
He was born in Ontario. In 1904 he was part of Canada's gold medal-winning 1904 Olympic team, in which he played in all two matches as a forward and scored three goals against USA's Christian Brothers College (1) and St. Rose Parish (2), finishing the tournament as the joint-top scorer alongside fellow teammate Alexander Hall, thus contributing decisively in his side's triumph. After the 1904 Games, Tom moved to Winnipeg and became Assistant Manager of the A.R. Williams Machine Company to at least 1936.

He should not be confused with Thomas G. Taylor who was a coach of the US Naval Academy's soccer team.

Honours

International
Canada Olympic
 Summer Olympic Games: 1904

Individual
 Summer Olympic Games top-scorer: 1904 (3 goals)

References

External links
 
 
 

1880 births
1945 deaths
Canadian soccer players
Canadian people of British descent
Association football forwards
Footballers at the 1904 Summer Olympics
Olympic gold medalists for Canada
Olympic soccer players of Canada
Soccer people from Ontario
Olympic medalists in football
Medalists at the 1904 Summer Olympics